Ron Perleman is a misspelling of:

 Ron Perlman, actor
 Ron Perelman, businessman